Website builders are tools that typically allow the construction of websites without manual code editing. They fall into two categories: 
 online proprietary tools provided by web hosting service companies. These are typically intended for service users to build their own website. Some services allow the site owner to use alternative tools (commercial or open-source) — the more complex of these may also be described as content management systems.
 Application software software that runs on a personal computing device used to create and edit the pages of a web site and then publish these pages on any host. (These are often considered to be "website design software", rather than "website builders".)

History
The first website, manually written in HTML, was created on August 6, 1991.

Over time, software was created to help design web pages. For example, Microsoft released FrontPage in November 1995.

By 1998, Dreamweaver had been established as the industry leader; however, some have criticized the quality of the code produced by such software as being overblown and reliant on HTML tables. As the industry moved towards W3C standards, Dreamweaver and others were criticized for not being compliant. Compliance has improved over time, but many professionals still prefer to write optimized markup by hand.

Open source tools were typically developed to the standards and made fewer exceptions for the then-dominant Internet Explorer's deviations from the standards.

The W3C started Amaya in 1996 to showcase Web technologies in a fully featured Web client. This was to provide a framework that integrated many W3C technologies in a single, consistent environment. Amaya started as an HTML and CSS editor and now supports XML, XHTML, MathML, and SVG.

GeoCities was one of the first more modern site builders that didn't require any technical skills. Five years after its launch in 1994 Yahoo! purchased it for $3.6 billion. After becoming obsolescent, it was shut down in April 2009.

Online vs. offline

Online website builders typically require customers to sign up with the web hosting company. Some companies provide examples of fully functional websites made with their website builder. The range of services varies anywhere between creating basic personal web pages or social network content to making complete business and e-commerce websites, either template based or, on the more flexible platforms, totally design free.

The main advantage of an online website builder is that it is quick and easy to use, and often does not require prior experience. Often, a website can be built and be up and running live on the Internet quickly. Technical support is usually provided, as are how-to video and help files.

HTML tools are divided into those that allow editing of the source code and those that only have a WYSIWYG mode.

Offline web builders cater to professional web designers who need to create pages for more than one client or web host. Modern offline web builders are usually both WYSIWYG and allow direct editing of source code and cascading style sheets (CSS) styling. They generally require at least a basic understanding of HTML and CSS. Although they are more flexible than online builders, many proprietary offline website builder software can be expensive, however, there are also many open-source website builders.

See also
 Comparison of HTML editors
 List of HTML editors
 Web design
 HTML editor
 Visual editor

References

Web development software
Web design
Web development
Web programming